Vijayapuram  is a village in the Aranthangirevenue block of Pudukkottai district, Tamil Nadu, India.

Demographics 

As of the 2001 census, Vijayapuram had a total population of 2063 with 1024 males and 1039 females. Out of the total population 1393 people were literate.

References

Villages in Pudukkottai district